Iben Bergstein (born 20 May 1995) is a Danish badminton player. Bergstein educated at the Rødovre Gymnasium, and played for the Hvidovre club for 13 years. In 2017, she started to play for Højbjerg.

Achievements

BWF International Challenge/Series (2 titles, 6 runners-up) 
Women's singles

Women's doubles

Mixed doubles

  BWF International Challenge tournament
  BWF International Series tournament
  BWF Future Series tournament

References

External links 
 

1995 births
Living people
People from Rødovre
Danish female badminton players
Sportspeople from the Capital Region of Denmark
21st-century Danish women